''Note: For 'Booster bicycle' see Electric bicycle

Booster Bike is a steel roller coaster located at Toverland in the Netherlands. It is the prototype of a motorbike rollercoaster, built by Vekoma.

Design and construction
In 2003, Vekoma premiered the Motorbike Coaster at the IAAPA expo. The reception was good, as it received the Award for "Best Idea Euro Amusement Show 2004 – Paris" at the Euro Amusement Show in Paris. The major difference with the normal sitdown rollercoaster is the positioning of the rider. Instead of the normal sitting seats, the rider takes place in a seat that is more leaning forward, like an actual motorbike. The rider can hold on to the 'steering wheel', and the rider is secured using a harness that pushes down on the back of the rider.

Ride layout

The ride  layout is Out and Back, characterized by the long, stretching launch and the hills parallel to the launch. The ride starts with an S-curve, after which the train will be stopped before the launch. When the train is launched to 75 km/h (46.6 mph), it takes a stretched hill, which is followed by a turn to the right and the horseshoe. Then the horizontal loop and a left turn follow. The last part consists of two hills. After those, the ride ends with a brake run and a corner left.

Similar rides
After this motorbike coaster, two more were built. A clone of Booster Bike was built in China, in Chimelong Paradise. In Flamingoland, a custom model was built, with a different positioning of the helix parts.

References

Roller coasters in the Netherlands